Steven Elliott (born 22 February 1995) is a  wheelchair basketball player from Australia.

Biography 

Elliott was born on 22 February 1995. He contracted transverse myelitis. in 2018, he is studying Sports Studies degree at the University of the Sunshine Coast. 

He took up wheelchair basketball at fourteen. Elliott was a member of the Spinners, the Australian under-23 wheelchair basketball team that won the bronze medal at the world championships in Toronto, Canada. In 2018, he was a member of the Rollers that won the bronze medal at 2018 Wheelchair Basketball World Championship in Hamburg, Germany.

He is a member of Queensland Spinning Bullets in the National Wheelchair Basketball League.

References

External links
Baskedtball Australia Profile

1995 births
Living people
Paralympic wheelchair basketball players of Australia
Point guards